Air Marshal Jagjeet Singh PVSM, VSM, ADC was the former Air Officer Commanding-in-Chief of Maintenance Command of Indian Air Force headquartered at Nagpur.

Education
He has done his Matric from Senior Model High School Patiala, and completed 12th from Mahendra College Patiala. He holds bachelor's degree in Electrical Engineering from Thapar University, Patiala, Punjab. He also holds a PG Diploma in Management from IGNOU.

Career
He was commissioned into Aeronautical Engineering Branch of Indian Air Force in 1977 .The officer has rich experience in maintenance management of aircraft and systems and has held various field and staff appointments. He has commanded a Technical Type Training School for fighter aircraft and a Base Repair Depot. He has also held the appointments of Chief Engineering Officer at Air Force Academy, Command Engineering Officer at Headquarters of South Western Air Command and Senior Maintenance Staff Officer at Headquarters of Central Air Command. The Air Officer has been Director-General (Aircraft), Director General (Systems) and Air Officer-in-Charge Maintenance at Air Headquarters before succeeding Air Marshal P Kanakraj as the AOC-in-C of Maintenance Command.

Personal life
Air Marshal Jagjeet Singh popularly known as "Jaggi" amongst his fellow members is an avid sportsman and likes to play Squash and Golf. In his spare time, he loves to read and is very fond of going for long walks. He is a religious and God fearing person and also likes to listen to soft music.

Awards and decorations

 Chief of the Air Staff Commendation (Twice)

References

Indian Air Force air marshals
Year of birth missing (living people)
Living people
Recipients of the Param Vishisht Seva Medal